Animal is a 2018 Argentine-Spanish drama thriller film directed by Armando Bó II, starring Guillermo Francella and Carla Peterson. Animal was partially funded by Argentina's National Institute of Cinema and Audiovisual Arts (INCAA).

Plot
Antonio Decoud, a family man and manager of a meat processing plant, lives a wealthy life in an upper-class neighborhood in Mar del Plata. His polite lifestyle is shaken by an unexpected illness. Decoud will be forced to fight on unknown ground in order to find an organ donor. Meanwhile, Elías Montero and his pregnant wife Lucy Villar, a homeless couple, see an opportuniy to change their lives by extorting money from Decoud.

Cast 

 Guillermo Francella... Antonio Decoud
 Carla Peterson... Susana Decoud
 Federico Salles... Elías Montero
 Mercedes De Santis... Lucy Villar
 Gloria Carrá... Josefina Hertz
 Marcelo Subiotto... Gabriel Hertz
 Majo Chicar... Linda Decoud
 Joaquín Flammini... Tomás Decoud

Reception 
Ezequiel Boetti from Otros Cines says that Bo made an essay on cruelty, selfishness, contempt and class conflict. Ambito Financiero's Paraná Sendrós praises Francella's characterization of Decoud, and describes the movie as a satire on the fragile nature of relationships and fortune. Gaspar Zimerman from Clarín compares Animal with Cape Fear, as both films are "fictional experiments" that confront a scared bourgeois with an out-of-control underclass. Tobias Dunschen from Critique Film observes the lack of a dramatic counterweight to the flashy treatment of Decoud's frenzied search for a life-saving organ. Arantxa Acosta, from La Realidad no Existe, called the film "terrifying" because it inspires empathy for the two antagonists, Decoud and Montero, no matter how low they can fall.

Accolades 
Animal competed in the following film festivals:

 Chicago International Film Festival
 Busan International Film Festival
 Fajr Film Festival
 Le Roche-sur-Yon Festival
 Sitges Film Festival

References

External links 

2010s Argentine films
2010s Spanish-language films
2018 films
Argentine drama films
Films shot in Mar del Plata